From... Another Time & Place is an album by folk singer and guitarist Dave Van Ronk, released in 1995.

The Allmusic Guide review states it is not a re-issue, but the Dave Van Ronk discography states it is a re-issue of Dave Van Ronk in Rome. The track list is the same.

Van Ronk received a Grammy nomination for From... Another Time & Place at the Grammy Awards of 1996 in the Traditional Folk Album category.

Reception

Writing for Allmusic, critic William Ruhlman wrote of the album "Always gruff-voiced, Van Ronk in his 60th year has lost nothing and perhaps even gained a more subtle expressiveness."

Track listing
"Another Time & Place" (Van Ronk) – 4:15
"Lovin' Spoonful" (Davis) – 3:15
"(I'm Your) Hoochie Coochie Man" (Willie Dixon) – 3:50
"The Old Man" (Bob Dylan) – 1:40
"Frankie's Blues" (Van Ronk) – 4:20
"Honey Hair" (Van Ronk) – 3:10
"Kansas City Blues" (Traditional) – 2:10
"Down South Blues" (Traditional) – 3:45
"Bad Dream Blues" (Van Ronk) – 3:35
"Losers" (Van Ronk) – 2:40
"Long John" (Traditional) – 2:05
"He Was a Friend of Mine" (Dylan) – 3:30

Personnel
Dave Van Ronk – vocals, guitar

References

External links
Dave Van Ronk Discography

1995 albums
Dave Van Ronk albums